Shadvidamargini (pronounced , meaning the one with the road to a hundred forms of knowledge) is a ragam in Carnatic music (musical scale of South Indian classical music). It is the 46th melakarta rāgam (parent scale) in the 72 melakarta rāgam system of Carnatic music. It is called Stavarājam in Muthuswami Dikshitar school of Carnatic music.

Structure and Lakshana

It is the 4th rāgam in the 8th chakra Vasu. The mnemonic name is Vasu-Bhu. The mnemonic phrase is sa ra gi mi pa dhi ni. Its  structure (ascending and descending scale) is as follows (see swaras in Carnatic music for details on below notation and terms):
: 
: 

The swaras shuddha rishabham, sadharana gandharam, prati madhyamam, chathusruthi dhaivatham and kaisiki nishadham are used in this scale. As it is a melakarta rāgam, by definition it is a sampoorna rāgam (has all seven notes in ascending and descending scale). It is the prati madhyamam equivalent of Natakapriya, which is the 10th melakarta scale.

Janya rāgams 
Shadvidamargini has a few minor janya rāgams (derived scales) associated with it. See List of janya rāgams for full list of rāgams associated with Shadvidamargini.

Compositions
A few compositions set to Shadvidhamargini are:

Jnanam Osaga Rada by Tyagaraja
Andaranga Bhakthi by Koteeswara Iyer
Haimavate bhaja manasa by Dr. M. Balamuralikrishna
sharanam tava charanam by Bharani
Geetham pada ugandha (Krithi) by Senarylia Shashtri

Related rāgams
This section covers the theoretical and scientific aspect of this rāgam.

Shadvidamargini's notes when shifted using Graha bhedam, yields Nasikabhooshani, a minor melakarta rāgam. Graha bhedam is the step taken in keeping the relative note frequencies same, while shifting the shadjam to the next note in the rāgam.

Notes

References

Melakarta ragas